Oligia chlorostigma is a species of cutworm or dart moth in the family Noctuidae.

The MONA or Hodges number for Oligia chlorostigma is 9402.

References

Further reading

 
 
 

Oligia
Articles created by Qbugbot
Moths described in 1876